Erik Norlander (born 6 February 1967) is an American musician known for his work in the progressive rock genre.  From 2007 to 2014, he was the touring and recording keyboardist for Asia Featuring John Payne. He is also the managing director of the sound production company Sonic Reality.

History
Starting in 1993, Norlander's earliest releases were with his band Rocket Scientists.  He also collaborated in multiple roles on albums released by Lana Lane, his wife.

In November 2007, Norlander was announced as the keyboard player for the Asia spin-off, Asia Featuring John Payne.

In 2009 Norlander was involved in a group named Roswell Six, who record album accompaniments to the work of science fiction writer and lyricist Kevin J. Anderson.  Norlander produced and composed the music for the group's album Terra Incognita: Beyond the Horizon.  The album featured a variety of guest vocalists including James LaBrie, John Payne, Michael Sadler of Saga and Lana Lane.

Norlander also toured in Europe in 2009 with vocalist Joe Lynn Turner and the band Big Noize, featuring bassist Phil Soussan, guitarist Carlos Cavazo and drummer Simon Wright. In 2011, Norlander again played with Big Noize, reformed with drummer Vinny Appice.

In 2014, Norlander played Hammond organ on the blues rock album by Alastair Greene, Trouble At Your Door.

Norlander worked extensively with the non-profit organization, the Bob Moog Foundation, from 2009 to present as both artist and advisor.

In 2016, Norlander joined heavy metal band Last in Line as their touring keyboardist, debuting with the band in Miami, Florida, on 20 January 2016. It was also announced that Norlander had joined the rock ballet production Heart of Storm with live dates in 2017 announced. He is also involved in the duo, Dukes of the Orient.

Norlander was also a key designer of the IK Multimedia UNO Synth.

Discography

Solo albums

Studio albums 
 Threshold (1997, re-released as a 2-CD package in 2003 as Threshold Special Edition)
 Into the Sunset (2000)
 Music Machine (2003, 2CD)
 Seas of Orion (2004)
 Hommage Symphonique (2006)
 The Galactic Collective (2010, re-released as a 2-CD and DVD package in 2012 as "The Galactic Collective - Definitive Edition")
 Surreal (2016)

Live albums 
 Stars Rain Down (2004)
 Live in St. Petersburg (2006, CD and DVD)
 The Galactic Collective: Live in Gettysburg (2012, 2-CD and DVD)

Rocket Scientists albums 
 Earthbound (1993)
 Brutal Architecture (1995)
 Earth Below and Sky Above: Live in Europe and America (1998)
 Oblivion Days (1999)
 Revolution Road (2006)
 Looking Backward (2007)
 Supernatural Highways (2014)
 Refuel (2014)

Lana Lane albums 
 Love Is an Illusion (1995)
 Curious Goods (1996)
 Garden of the Moon (1998)
 Echoes from the Garden (1998) Japan only
 Live in Japan (1998) Japan only
 Ballad Collection (1998) Japan only
 Queen of the Ocean (1999)
 Echoes from the Ocean (1998) Japan only
 Best of Lana Lane 1995 – 1999 (1999) Japan only
 Secrets of Astrology (2000)
 Ballad Collection II (2000) Japan only
 Ballad Collection – Special Edition (2000)
 Project Shangri-La (2002)
 Covers Collection (2003)
 Winter Sessions (2003)
 Return to Japan (2004)
 Storybook: Tales from Europe and Japan (DVD, 2004)
 Lady Macbeth (2005)
 10th Anniversary Concert (DVD/CD set, 2006)
 Gemini (2006)
 Red Planet Boulevard (2007)
 Best of Lana Lane 2000 – 2008 (2008) Japan only
 El Dorado Hotel (2012)

References

External links
Official Erik Norlander's website
Erik Norlander NAMM Oral History Interview (2009)

1967 births
Living people
American rock keyboardists
20th-century American keyboardists
American record producers
American audio engineers
American heavy metal keyboardists